Autódromo Internacional El Jabalí is a  long, permanent motor racing circuit, located  northwest of San Salvador in El Salvador, in the municipality of Quezaltepeque.

History
The Autodrome was founded in 1974 by the operating company Autodromos de El Salvador S.A. with the representatives of Automóvil Club de El Salvador (ACES) and the then FIA representative Robert Langford planned. The property with approximately 100 hectares was acquired on 3 December 1976. As architect and project manager Oscar Monedero was entrusted. Construction began in March 1978. In February 1979, the racetrack was inaugurated with the Gran Premio Delta with the participation of drivers from the United States, Canada, Puerto Rico, Colombia and Spain.

References 

Sports venues completed in 1979
El Jabali